Multiple Sarcasms is a 2010 American drama film starring Timothy Hutton, Mira Sorvino, Stockard Channing, Dana Delany, Chris Sarandon and Mario Van Peebles. It was sold at the European Film Market on February 6, 2009 and was released in the United States May 7, 2010.

Plot

Gabriel (Timothy Hutton) is a man who, on the surface, has a perfect life: successful career as an architect, a beautiful wife, and a devoted young daughter. However, he realizes that he is not really happy. He decides to write a play about the sorry state of his life. After being fired from his job, he gets a pushy literary agent friend to represent him and starts writing. Eventually, his life does change.

Cast
Timothy Hutton as Gabriel
Mira Sorvino as Cari
Stockard Channing as Pamela
Dana Delany as Annie
Chris Sarandon as Larry
Mario Van Peebles as Rocky
Aileen Quinn as School Secretary
Eric Sheffer Stevens as Gabriel (Stage)
India Ennenga as Elizabeth
Joan Jett as herself

References

External links

Multiple Sarcasms at RottenTomatoes

American drama films
2010 films
2010 drama films
2010s English-language films
2010s American films